Thomas William Hungerford (March 21, 1936 – November 28, 2014) was an American mathematician who worked in algebra and mathematics education. He is the author or coauthor of several widely used and widely cited textbooks covering high-school to graduate-level mathematics. From 1963 until 1980 he taught at the University of Washington and then at Cleveland State University until 2003. From 2003–2014 he was at Saint Louis University. Hungerford had a special interest in promoting the use of technology to teach mathematics.

Hungerford did his undergraduate work at the College of the Holy Cross and defended his Ph.D. thesis at the University of Chicago in 1963 (advised by Saunders Mac Lane). Throughout his career he wrote more than a dozen widely used mathematics textbooks, ranging from high school to graduate level.

Bibliography

Graduate
 1974  Algebra (Graduate Texts in Mathematics #73). Springer Verlag.

Undergraduate
 1997  Abstract Algebra:  An Introduction, 2nd Edition. Cengage. 
 2005  Contemporary College Algebra and Trigonometry, 2nd Edition. Cengage. 
 2005  Contemporary College Algebra, 2nd Edition. Cengage. 
 2006  Contemporary Trigonometry. Cengage. 
 2009  Contemporary Precalculus, 5th Edition (with Douglas J. Shaw). Cengage. 
 2011  Mathematics with Applications, 10th Edition (with Margaret L. Lial and John P. Holcomb, Jr).  Pearson. 
 2011  Finite Mathematics with Applications, 10th Edition (with Margaret L. Lial and John P. Holcomb, Jr). Pearson. 
 2013 Abstract Algebra: An Introduction, 3rd Edition, Cengage.

High school
 2002  Precalculus:  A Graphing Approach (with Irene Jovell and Betty Mayberry). Holt, Rinehart & Winston.

References

External links
 

Algebraists
20th-century American mathematicians
21st-century American mathematicians
College of the Holy Cross alumni
University of Chicago alumni
University of Washington faculty
Cleveland State University faculty
Saint Louis University faculty
Saint Louis University mathematicians
People from Oak Park, Illinois
1936 births
2014 deaths
Mathematicians from Illinois